These were the 12 teams picked to take part in the 2004 ICC Champions Trophy, the third instalment of the Champions Trophy cricket tournament. The tournament was held in England from 10 September to 25 September 2004. Teams could name a preliminary squad of 30, but only 14-man squads were permitted for the actual tournament.

Squads

References and notes

ICC Champions Trophy squads
2004 ICC Champions Trophy